"Hemorrhage (In My Hands)" is a song by American rock band Fuel. It was released in September 2000 as the lead single from their second studio album Something Like Human. It hit number two on the Mainstream Rock Tracks chart, also their highest-charting single on the chart. To date, it is Fuel's highest charting single on the U.S. Billboard Hot 100 chart, peaking at number 30. It also peaked number 17 on the Adult Top 40 chart and number 22 on the Mainstream Top 40 chart.

Background and writing
Carl Bell explained on an episode of VH1 Storytellers in 2001 stating: "This is as deep as it goes, for me. When I was younger, my grandmother got cancer. By the time they found it, it was much too late. Instead of sitting in some hospital, she wanted to go home and be home. And my mother and my aunts and their husbands went to sit with her at home. A few months passed, and the cancer had spread, it had eaten up most of her body and all of her hope, and it was a bad time. One particular day was a really bad day for her. My mother was sitting with her that evening, and she turned to my mom, and said, 'How do you die?' It crushed my mom, and it's still crushing me."

American Idol
Chris Daughtry performed this song on American Idol as a contestant in early 2006, which was during the period after longtime singer and guitarist Brett Scallions had left the group, prompting Fuel bassist Jeff Abercrombie and guitarist and songwriter Carl Bell to publicly ask Daughtry to be their new lead singer on the television show Extra. On the show, Abercrombie stated: "Chris, if you are watching, we've talked about this before, and if you want to entertain it again we'll take it and go..." Daughtry, although flattered, eventually declined the offer, opting to form his own band, Daughtry, instead.

Music video
The music video for "Hemorrhage (In My Hands)" was directed by Nigel Dick and was filmed between August 1–2, 2000 at Kitchener City Hall in Kitchener, Ontario, Canada and features the band performing as well as Nick Koppell and Szilvia Jones playing a couple. The red car is a 1971 Buick Riviera.

Track listing
"Hemorrhage (In My Hands)"
"Easy"
"Stripped Away"
"Going to California" (Led Zeppelin cover, written by Jimmy Page, Robert Plant)

Critical reception
The song was Billboard magazine's number five Rock Song of the Decade, according to their Best of the 2000s Rock Songs chart.  In 2013, "Hemorrhage (In My Hands)" became the number six alternative rock song of the past 25 years, according to Billboards Alternative chart 25th Anniversary: Top 100 Songs.

Charts

Weekly charts

Year-end charts

References

External links

2000s ballads
2000 singles
Fuel (band) songs
Music videos directed by Nigel Dick
Hard rock ballads
Songs written by Carl Bell (musician)
2000 songs
Epic Records singles